"Ballin' the Jack" (or sometimes "Balling the Jack") is a popular song from 1913 written by Jim Burris with music by Chris Smith. It introduced a popular dance of the same name with "Folks in Georgia's 'bout to go insane." It became a ragtime, pop, and traditional jazz standard, and has been recorded hundreds of times.

Origin
Around the same time the song came out, the expression "ballin' the jack" was used by railroad workers to mean "going at full speed."  'The 'Jack' was the slang name for a railroad locomotive, and balling meant going at high speed, itself  derived from the ball type of railroad signal in which a high ball meant a clear line. Why this name was chosen for the dance is not clear.

The composer and entertainer Perry Bradford claimed to have seen the dance steps performed around 1909 and they are similar to the shimmy which has black African origins.

The dance moves were standardized in the Savoy Ballroom, and put to music by Smith and Burris in 1913.  The tune became popular in the Ziegfeld Follies of 1913.

Notable version
Greg & Steve recorded their version on We All Live Together, Vol. 4 (1980)

Parodies
Allan Sherman borrowed the melody for his Vietnam-era song parody "Dodgin' the Draft".

See also
List of pre-1920 jazz standards

References

Bibliography
Burris, Jim (w.); Smith, Chris (m.). "Ballin' the Jack" (Sheet Music). New York: Jos. W. Stern & Co. (1913).

External links
"Ballin' the Jack", National Promenade Band (Edison Blue Amberol 2480, 1914)—Cylinder Preservation and Digitization Project.

1913 songs
1910s jazz standards
Songs with music by Chris Smith (composer)
The Osmonds songs
Novelty and fad dances
Songs about dancing